Zoltan Nusser is a  physiologist. He was awarded the Lieben Prize in 2004.

He graduated from the University of Budapest, in 1992 and received his Ph.D. in Physiology from Oxford University in 1995. He works at the Institute of Experimental Medicine in Budapest since 2000.

References

Year of birth missing (living people)
Living people
Hungarian physiologists
Alumni of the University of Oxford
Eötvös Loránd University alumni